is a feminine/neutral Japanese given name.

Possible writings
Eriko can be written using different kanji characters and can mean:
恵梨子, "blessing, pear, child"
恵理子, "blessing, reason, child"
絵里子, "picture, hometown, child"
絵梨子, "picture, pear, child"
絵理子, "picture, reason, child"
江里子, "inlet, hometown, child"
恵里子, "blessing, hometown, child"
恵利子, "blessing, profit, child"
江利子, "inlet, profit, child"
枝里子, "branch, hometown, child"
英梨子, "excel, pear, child"
The name can also be written in hiragana or katakana.

People with the name
Eriko Arakawa (恵理子, born 1979), Japanese female footballer
Eriko Asai (えり子, born 1959), Japanese long-distance runner
Eriko Fujimaki (恵理子, born 1974), Japanese voice actress
Eriko Hara (えりこ, born 1959), Japanese voice actress
Eriko Hirose (栄理子, born 1985), Japanese badminton player
Eriko Hori (絵梨子, born 1988), Korean-Japanese singer, actress and voice actress
Eriko Imai (絵理子, born 1983), Ryukyuan J-pop artist
, Japanese speed skater
, Japanese audio director
Eriko Kitagawa (悦吏子, born 1961), Japanese screenwriter and film director
, Japanese Paralympic goalball player
Eriko Kusuda (枝里子), a Japanese freelance television announcer
Eriko Matsui (恵理子松井, born 1989), Japanese voice actress
Eriko Nakamura (中村繪里子, born 1981), Japanese voice actress
Eriko Ono, Japanese manga artist
, Japanese speed skater
Eriko Sato (江梨子, born 1981), Japanese actress and model
, Japanese speed skater
Eriko Tamura (英里子, born 1973), Japanese actress and singer
Eri Watanabe (えり子, born 1955), Japanese actress, previously credited as Eriko Watanabe
Eriko Yamaguchi, women's professional shogi player
Eriko Yamatani (えり子, born 1950), Japanese politician

Fictional characters
Eriko Christy, a protagonist of the video game Illbleed
Eriko Takahashi (絵里子), a main character of the erotic comedy manga series High School Girls
Eriko Torii (江利子), a character from the manga and anime series Maria-sama ga Miteru
Eriko Kirishima, a character in Revelations: Persona video game
Eriko Fukada, a young writer of Haruki Murakamis novel 1Q84. She is often referred Fukaeri, her pseudonym
Eriko, sister of main character of the manga series and anime adaptation of Ajin.

See also
Idol Densetsu Eriko, a Japanese anime series

Japanese feminine given names